Villiam Haag (born 25 November 1993) is a Swedish ice hockey player currently playing for Almtuna IS of the HockeyAllsvenskan.

He played 11 games for the Muskegon Lumberjacks (USHL) during the 2012–13 season and also appeared for Michigan State University between 2013 and 2017. Haag made his Elitserien debut playing with Frölunda HC during the 2011–12 Elitserien season.

References

External links

1993 births
Frölunda HC players
HC Vita Hästen players
Living people
Michigan State Spartans men's ice hockey players
Muskegon Lumberjacks players
Swedish ice hockey forwards
Ice hockey people from Gothenburg